The  1993-94 French Rugby Union Championship was contested by 32 clubs divided into four pools. At the end of the first phase, the teams placed in the first four places of each pool were admitted to the "Top 16" arranged with four pools of four teams. The first two of each pool were admitted to the quarter finals.

The four clubs of Périgueux, Dijon, Lyon OU and Lourdes, the newcomer, coming from "Group B" 1992-93.

Toulouse won its 11th title, beating Montferrand in the final. Toulouse became, with Béziers, the winner of the most titles. Montferrand lost another final. At the end of the season Mon de Marsan, Lourdes, Béziers and Lyon OU were relegated.

Participants 

Teams listed as in the final ranking. Teams in bold qualified to the next round.

Top 16 
Team listed as in the final ranking. Teams in bold qualified to next round.

Final stages

Quarter-finals

Semifinals

Final

Notes

Bibliografia

External links
 Compte rendu de la finale 1994 sur www.lnr.fr

1994
France
Championship